Temple–Baraitser syndrome (TBS) is a very rare autosomal dominant genetic disorder, characterised by intellectual disability, epilepsy, small or absent nail of the thumbs and great toes, and distinct craniofacial features.

Genetics 

TBS is caused by pathogenic variants (mutations) in the KCNH1 gene at chromosomal locus 1q32.2, (GRCh38): 1:210,678,313-211,134,147. It has an autosomal dominant transmission, however affected individuals are not known to reproduce, so all reported cases have been caused by de novo mutations or transmission from a mosaic parent.

Diagnosis

Temple–Baraitser syndrome is diagnosed by clinical examination of a person with a severe developmental disability, intellectual impairment and epilepsy. The face is often long and myopathic. Overgrown gums become apparent in late childhood. The finger and toenails are characteristically small, with complete or almost complete absence of the nails of the thumb (pollex) and great toe (hallux). The diagnosis can be confirmed by demonstrating a gain-of-function mutation in the KCNH1 gene. Temple–Baraitser has clinical and genetic overlap with type 1 Zimmermann–Laband syndrome.

Management 

Affected individuals should see a pediatrician or adult physician at least annually to monitor growth, development, seizures and general health and well-being. Developmental potential is maximized through the use of physiotherapy, occupational therapy and speech pathology. Anticonvulsants are used to control epilepsy.

Prevalence

With fewer than 100 cases having been reported worldwide, the exact prevalence is unknown but is believed to be rare. It is likely to be underdiagnosed, with one large study identifying 2.7% of people with intellectual disability to have a mutation in KCNH1.

Etymology 

The syndrome's named was coined by Michael Gabbett who named it after English clinical geneticists Karen Temple and Michael Baraitser. Temple and Baraitser described the first case in 1991.

References

External links 

 Human Disease Genes - KCNH1

Genetic syndromes
Rare syndromes